Cassinia hewsoniae is a species of flowering plant in the family Asteraceae and is native to New South Wales and the Australian Capital Territory. It is an erect shrub with a sticky, densely-hairy stems, needle-shaped leaves and flower heads arranged in flat or rounded corymbs.

Description
The edges of the leaves are rolled under, the upper surface is sticky and the lower surface of the leaves is densely covered with cottony hairs. The flower heads are arranged in flat or rounded corymbs of forty to one hundred heads, each head with seven to twelve cream coloured florets surrounded by involucral bracts in five whorls. The achenes are silvery-white with a bristly pappus of 15 to 17 bristles.

Taxonomy and naming
Cassinia hewsoniae was first formally described in 2004 by Anthony Edward Orchard in Australian Systematic Botany from specimens collected near Manildra in 2004.

Distribution and habitat
This species of Cassinia grows in mallee and woodland in south-central New South Wales and in the Australian Capital Territory.

References

hewsoniae
Asterales of Australia
Flora of New South Wales
Flora of the Australian Capital Territory
Plants described in 2004